Shayr Mohamed González (born 4 April 2000) is a Mexican professional footballer who plays as a forward for Argentine Primera División club Arsenal de Sarandí.

Club career

Youth career
Mohamed first joined Monterrey youth academy in 2015 taking part in U-15. Then he joined Argentine Club Atlético Huracán playing in the youth academy between 2016 and 2019. Briefly making the move to Atlético San Luis for a year in 2019. Until making his return to Monterrey's youth academy in 2020 later that year. Mohamed finally received the chance to join C.F. Monterrey first-team making his professional debut under his father who was coaching at that time Antonio Mohamed. In 2021 Mohamed joined the Tijuana youth academy.

C.F. Monterrey
Mohamed made his professional senior debut with C.F. Monterrey on 22 August 2020 against Club América coming in as a substitute for Rogelio Funes Mori in the 90th minute of the game. During the 92nd minute during overtime he caused a foul against Sergio Díaz and received a red card just 2 minutes into his debut.

Personal life
Mohamed's father Antonio is an Argentine-born football manager and former player. Through his father, he is of Lebanese, Syrian, Argentine, Chilean and Croatian descent.

Career statistics

Club

Notes

Honours
Monterrey
 Copa MX: 2019–20

References

External links

2000 births
Living people
People from San Pedro Garza García, Nuevo León
Mexican people of Argentine descent
Mexican people of Lebanese descent
Mexican people of Syrian descent
Mexican people of Croatian descent
Mexican people of Chilean descent
Mexican people of Arab descent
Mexican expatriate footballers
Footballers from Nuevo León
Association football forwards
C.F. Monterrey players
Club Atlético Huracán footballers
Atlético San Luis footballers
Club Tijuana footballers
Cancún F.C. footballers
Arsenal de Sarandí footballers
Liga MX players
Mexican expatriate sportspeople in Argentina
Expatriate footballers in Argentina
Mexican footballers